Wales House may refer to:

Australia 

 Wales House, Sydney, a heritage-listed former office building, bank building and now hotel in Sydney, New South Wales

Belgium 

Wales House (Brussels), the Welsh Government office in Belgium

United States 

Mary Anne Wales House, Dublin, New Hampshire, listed on the National Register of Historic Places (NRHP)
Wales House (Hyde Park, New York), NRHP-listed
Wales (Petersburg, Virginia), a historic house and plantation, NRHP-listed
North Wales (Warrenton, Virginia), a historic house and plantation, NRHP-listed